Hingston is a surname. Notable people with the surname include:

Dick Hingston (born 1915), Australian rules footballer who played for Melbourne in the Victorian Football League
John Hingston (died 1683), composer and organist DNB entry at Wikisource
Richard Hingston (1887–1966), Fellow of the Royal Geographical Society, a physician, explorer and naturalist
Seán Martin Hingston, New York-based actor
Thomas Hingston MD (died 1837), English antiquary
William Hales Hingston, KCB (1829–1907), Canadian physician, politician, banker, and Senator

See also
Hingston Down, a hill in Cornwall
Hingston & Prideaux